Sajib (Popularly known as Master Sajib) is a Bangladeshi film and television actor. He won Bangladesh National Film Award for Best Child Artist for the film Surja Dighal Bari (1979) share with Elora Gohor.

Selected films
 Ovagi (1975)
 Surja Dighal Bari (1979)
 Gangchil (1980)

Awards and nominations
National Film Awards

References

External links

Bangladeshi film actors
Best Child Artist National Film Award (Bangladesh) winners
Living people
Year of birth missing (living people)